Colonial Flats and Annex, also known as The Colonial Apartments, is a historic apartment building located in the Allentown neighborhood of Buffalo, Erie County, New York, United States. The building consists of three components: the 1896 five-story, brick "Flats" to the north; the 1900 three-story brick "Annex" at the south end, and a 1926 single-story precast concrete commercial storefront that unites the Flats and Annex along Delaware Avenue. The Flats and Annex are internally connected and share a similar Colonial Revival style.

It was listed on the National Register of Historic Places in 2018.

References

Residential buildings on the National Register of Historic Places in New York (state)
Colonial Revival architecture in New York (state)
Residential buildings completed in 1896
Buildings and structures in Buffalo, New York
National Register of Historic Places in Buffalo, New York